Gabriel Mora i Arana (born 13 September 1925, Castellar del Vallès – died 25 November 2014, Manresa) was a Catalan writer, mechanic and seller, nominated in 1975 and 1990 to Mestre en Gai Saber. He was very active in the Esperantist movement.

Prizes
 Ciutat de Barcelona de poesia, 1971: Amb la mà esquerra
 Vila de Perpinyà, 1972: Roses a Psique
 Vila de Vallirana-Josep M. López Picó de poesia, 1975: Cercant aurores
 Flor Natural als Jocs Florals de Barcelona, 1977: Plenitud intacta
 Ciutat de Reus de poesia, 1985: Renou de mites
 Ciutat d'Olot-Guerau de Liost de poesia i prosa poètica, 1989: Innovació dels orígens
 Viola d'Or i Argent als Jocs Florals de Barcelona, 1990: Procés obert

Works 
 El poemari "Gènesi" a l'obra Tharrats, obra gràfica 1957-1990 (B: Parsifal, 1990)
 "Calidoscopi de sol i de celístia". Manresa: Obra Cultural de la Caixa de Manresa, 1980
 "Foc d'arrels". 1983. .
 "Renou de mites". Barcelona: Edicions del Mall, 1986.
 "Innovació dels orígens". Barcelona: Columna, 1990. .

References 

1925 births
2014 deaths
Writers from Catalonia
People from Vallès Occidental
Spanish Esperantists